Brees is a surname. Notable people with the surname include: 

Drew Brees (born 1979), American football player
Herbert J. Brees (1877–1958), American lieutenant general
Orlo M. Brees (1896–1980), American newspaper editor, author, and politician
Samuel Brees (c.1810–1865), New Zealand artist, surveyor and engineer